Ninette may refer to:

 Ninette (film), a 2005 Spanish film directed by José Luis Garci
 Ninette (opera), an 1896 opéra comique by Charles Lecocq
 Ninette, Manitoba

See also

Ninetta